For programming tools, Domino Internet Inter-ORB Protocol (DIIOP) is CORBA over IIOP for Lotus Domino. DIIOP allows external programs to attach to, and manipulate Domino databases. DIIOP is frequently used to allow Java-based and other non CORBA programs to connect to Lotus Domino.

See also
 General Inter-ORB Protocol
 Object Management Group

References

External links
 Configuring servers that use the DIIOP protocol
 Lotus Sametime Directory Assistance Bot (Uses DIIOP and the Sametime Java API)
 Domino Designer 6.5 Programming Posters (CORBA Posters At Page Bottom)
 Java access to the Domino Objects

Common Object Request Broker Architecture
Groupware
Object-oriented programming